Fernando Manuel de Bustillo Bustamante y Rueda (died 1719) served as the 37th Governor-General of the Captaincy General of the Philippines from 1717 until his assassination.

Governor-General of the Philippines 
Usually called mariscal (marshal) as he was the first field marshal to govern the Islands, Bustamante was the former alcalde mayor of Trascala, in Nueva España (modern-day Mexico). He was appointed governor by royal provision on September 6, 1708 and arrived at Manila on August 9, 1717.

Considered severe in judgments, Bustamante was also responsible for re-establishing the garrison in Zamboanga in 1718.

Relationship with the Church 
Several individuals with pending charges had taken church asylum. Bustamante adopted very stringent measures to counteract excessive claims to immunity by Archbishop of Manila Francisco de la Cuesta. Archbishop De la Cuesta was appealed to either hand them over to the civil authorities or allow them to be taken. He refused to do either, supporting the claim of immunity of sanctuary. At the same time it came to the knowledge of the governor that a movement had been set on foot against him by those citizens who favoured the Archbishopʼs views.

José Torralba, the late acting-governor, was released from confinement by the governor, and reinstated by him as judge in the Supreme Court, although he was under an accusation of embezzlement to the extent of ₱700,000. The Archbishop energetically opposed Torralba's appointment, notifying the latter of his excommunication and ecclesiastical censures. With sword and shield in hand, Torralba expelled the Archbishopʼs messenger by force, then as judge in the Supreme Court, hastened to avenge himself by issuing warrants against his enemies. Torralba's opponents sought church asylum, and, with the moral support of the Archbishop, laughed at the clown.

Tensions climaxed when the governor's soldiers stormed Manila Cathedral, thereby violating the right of sanctuary. The violation was due to the governor's orders to recover the government inventories and official records held by a notary public who was then taking refuge in the Cathedral. Upon consultation with the Archbishop, Dominican canon law experts from the Real Universidad de Santo Tomás declared that "under no circumstances or conditions could civil authorities exercise jurisdiction within sacred places, even under the orders of the governor and of the audiencia.

The series of troubles with ecclesiastical authorities led to the arrest and imprisonment of Archbishop De la Cuesta, along with the Dominican friars and other clerics in league with the Archbishop.

Assassination 

In reaction to the Archbishop's imprisonment and to the government's total disregard of the church as a sanctuary, a mob of the Archbishop's supporters stormed the Palacio de Gobernador and killed Governor Bustamante. Archbishop De la Cuesta was released from prison and appointed acting Governor-General.

In art 
Félix Resurrección Hidalgo's The Assassination of Governor Bustamante at the National Art Gallery of the National Museum depicts the incident, showing a mob of Dominican friars dragging the governor down the Palacio's staircase.

However, according to Spanish historian, theologian, and former archivist at the a University of Santo Tomás Fr Fidel Villarroel, Ph.D., Hidalgo was misled by some advisers to wrongly portray the Spanish missionaries as the promoters of the murder. Antonio Regidor, a Freemason noted for his anticlerical sentiments, was the painter's adviser. Villarroel goes further by concluding that all the friars were far away from the scene at the moment of the assassination, imprisoned together with the Archbishop.

References 

Bustillo Bustamante y Rueda, Fernando Manuel de
1719 deaths
Year of birth unknown